USS Crux (AK-115) was a , converted from a Liberty Ship, commissioned by the US Navy for service in World War II. She was first named after Peter Stuyvesant, a Dutch politician that served as the last Dutch director-general of the colony of New Netherland from 1647 until it was ceded provisionally to the English in 1664. She was renamed and commissioned after Crux, a constellation centered on four stars in the southern sky in a bright portion of the Milky Way. She was responsible for delivering troops, goods and equipment to locations in the war zone.

Construction

Peter Stuyvesant was laid down on 27 September 1943, under a Maritime Commission (MARCOM) contract, MC hull 1212, by the St. Johns River Shipbuilding Company, Jacksonville, Florida; sponsored by Mrs. Frank D. Arthur, of Miami, and launched on 16 November 1943. She was transferred to the US Navy 27 November 1943, and renamed Crux. She was commissioned 17 March 1944.

Service history

Departing Norfolk, Virginia, 4 May 1944, Crux arrived at Espiritu Santo 14 June. From 20 June to 10 April 1944, Crux repeatedly loaded cargo at Brisbane, Australia, for such ports as Milne Bay, Finschhafen, Langemak Bay, Port Moresby, and Hollandia in New Guinea, and Manus, Admiralty Islands.

Her supply base was shifted to Subic Bay, Philippine Islands, in April 1945, and from 16 April to 15 October 1945, she carried cargo from that port to Humboldt Bay, and Mios Woendi, New Guinea, and Nissan Atoll, Bismarck Archipelago. Taking homeward-bound servicemen on board at Manila Bay, Crux sailed 15 November for San Francisco, California, arriving 10 December.

Decommissioning

The ship was decommissioned there and returned to the Maritime Commission (MARCOM) on 31 January 1946, and entered the Suisun Bay Reserve Fleet at Suisun Bay, California. Crux was stricken from the Navy list on 25 February 1946.

Resuming the name Peter Stuyvesant, the ship remained in reserve into the 1960s. She was sold for scrapping to the Union Minerals and Alloys Corporation, on 30 November 1961, for $58,689.89. She was removed from the fleet on 19 December 1961.

Military awards and honors 

Crux’s crew was eligible for the following campaign medals and ribbons:
 American Campaign Medal
 Asiatic-Pacific Campaign Medal
 World War II Victory Medal
 Philippines Liberation Medal

References

Bibliography

External links
 

 

Crater-class cargo ships
World War II auxiliary ships of the United States
Ships built in Jacksonville, Florida
1943 ships
Suisun Bay Reserve Fleet